Amor Total is the fourth studio album by Puerto Rican-American Bachata artist Toby Love released in 2014 through Top Stop Music.

Track listing

Charts

References

Toby Love albums
2013 albums
Spanish-language albums